Labor of Love is a 1981 studio album by American soul music vocal group The Spinners, released on Atlantic Records. This release followed a brief period of disco experimentation where the group returned to their Philly soul roots that gave the band a commercial and critical boost, but with this album, the slid to the bottom of sales charts and would fall off entirely within a few years.

Reception
Editors at AllMusic Guide scored Labor of Love three out of five stars, with reviewer Ron Wynn writing that this is when the group's commercial prospects began to slide, as audiences thought of them as a cover band reinterpreting crossover pop/rhythm and blues hits, noting that this album has "ebullient soul ballads and uptempo tunes" that builds upon their classic period, but which left them out of step with contemporary audiences.

Track listing
"Long Live Soul Music" (Willie Hutch) – 4:56
"Standing on the Rock" (Willie Hutch) – 4:29
"Medley: "Yesterday Once More" / "Nothing Remains the Same" (John Bettis and Richard Carpenter/Michael Zager) – 7:29
"Almost All the Way to Love" (John Lewis Parker and Harry Shannon) – 4:04
"The Winter of Our Love" (lyrics: Linda Creed, music: Michael Zager) – 3:49
"Be My Love" (lyrics: Sammy Cahn, music: Nicholas Brodsky) – 4:04
"Give Your Lady What She Wants" (Tony Wilson) – 3:19
"A Man Just Don't Know What a Woman Goes Through" (Bob Brabham, Linda Brown, and Archie P. Jordon) – 3:15
"The Deacon" (lyrics: Pervis Jackson, music: Michael Zager) – 4:25

Chart performance
Labor of Love marked a sharp downturn in commercial success from the band's past two albums, reaching 40 on the R&B chart and peaking at 128 on the Billboard 200.

Personnel

The Spinners
John Edwards – vocals, backing vocals
Henry Fambrough – vocals, backing vocals
Billy Henderson – vocals, backing vocals
Pervis Jackson – vocals, backing vocals
Bobby Smith – vocals, backing vocals
"Long Live Soul Music"
Gary Grant – flugelhorn, trumpet
Jerry Hey – flugelhorn, trumpet
Willie Hutch – bass guitar, rhythm arrangement
Kim Hutchcroft – alto saxophone
Eddie Summers – drums
Gemi "Master Phonk" Taylor – guitar
Melvin Webb – percussion
Larry Williams – tenor saxophone, synthesizer
Michael Zager – electric piano, rhythm arrangement
"Standing On the Rock"
Danny Cahn – trumpet
Ronnie Cuber – baritone saxophone
Eddie Daniels – alto saxophone
Lenny Hambro – tenor saxophone
Willie Hutch – bass guitar, rhythm arrangement
Robert Millikan – trumpet
Eddie Summers – drums
Gemi "Master Phonk" Taylor – guitar
Melvin Webb – percussion
Larry Williams – synthesizer
Michael Zager – electric piano, rhythm arrangement
Medley: "Yesterday Once More" / "Nothing Remains the Same"
Rubens Bassini – percussion
Dave Carey – vibraphone
Danny Cahn – trumpet
Mike Campbell – guitar
Francisco Centeno – bass guitar
Raymond Chew – keyboards
Raphael Cruz – percussion
Ronnie Cuber – baritone saxophone
Eddie Daniels – alto saxophone
Lenny Hambro – tenor saxophone
Yogi Horton – drums
Steve Love – guitar
Robert Millikan – trumpet
Cliff Morris – guitar
Larry Williams – synthesizer
"Almost All the Way to Love"
Mike Campbell – guitar
Yogi Horton – drums
Jimmy Maelen – percussion
Jolyon Skinner – bass guitar
Larry Williams – synthesizer
Michael Zager – keyboards
"The Winter of Our Love"
Rubens Bassini – percussion
Raphael Cruz – percussion
Steve Kahn – guitar
Will Lee – bass guitar
Cliff Morris – guitar
Rob Mounsey – synthesizer
Chris Parker – drums
Pat Rebillot – keyboards
"Be My Love"
Francisco Centeno – bass guitar
Raymond Chew – keyboards
Yogi Horton – drums
Steve Love – guitar
Cliff Morris – guitar
Larry Williams – synthesizer
"Give Your Lady What She Wants"
Mike Campbell – guitar
Dave Carey – vibraphone
Raymond Chew – keyboards
Neil Jason – bass guitar
Steve Love – guitar
Jimmy Maelen – percussion
Cliff Morris – guitar
Rob Mounsey – synthesizer
Allan Schwartzberg – drums
"A Man Just Don't Know What a Woman Goes Through"
Raymond Chew – keyboards
Neil Jason – bass guitar
Steve Love – guitar
Jimmy Maelen – percussion
Cliff Morris – guitar
Rob Mounsey – synthesizer
Allan Schwartzberg – drums
"The Deacon"
Gary Grant – flugelhorn, trumpet
Jerry Hey – flugelhorn, trumpet
Willie Hutch – bass guitar
Kim Hutchcroft – alto saxophone
Eddie Summers – drums
Gemi "Master Phonk" Taylor – guitar
Melvin Webb – percussion
Larry Williams – synthesizer, tenor saxophone
Michael Zager – electric piano
Technical personnel
Carla Bandini – mixing assistance
Dennis King – mastering at Atlantic Studios, New York City, New York, United States
Michael Hutchinson – mixing at Sigma Sound Studios, New York City, New York, United States
Jerry Love – executive production
Matthew Weiner – mixing assistance
Kim Whitesides – illustration
Sandy Young – art direction
Michael Zager – arrangement, conducting, productin

See also
List of 1981 albums

References

External links

1981 albums
The Spinners (American group) albums
Albums produced by Michael Zager
Atlantic Records albums